Aldo John Forte (January 20, 1918 – August 29, 2007) was a guard and an offensive tackle in the National Football League who played for the Chicago Bears, Detroit Lions, and the Green Bay Packers.  Forte played collegiate ball at the University of Montana before being drafted into the NFL by the Chicago Bears in the 21st round of the 1939 NFL Draft.  He played professionally for five seasons before retiring in 1947.

After retiring, Forte served as a longtime assistant offensive line coach for the Detroit Lions from 1950–1965. He died in Palm City, Florida in 2007.

References

1918 births
2007 deaths
Sportspeople from Chicago
Players of American football from Chicago
American football offensive guards
Montana Grizzlies football players
Chicago Bears players
Detroit Lions players
Green Bay Packers players
Detroit Lions coaches
People from Palm City, Florida